Black turtle may refer to:

 Black Tortoise, the Chinese constellations and Chinese astronomical sign
 Green sea turtle, a sea turtle also known as the black turtle or black sea turtle
 Indian black turtle,  a species of turtle found in South Asia
 West African black turtle, a species of turtle in the family Pelomedusidae, endemic to Africa
 Black river turtle, a species of turtle found in Costa Rica, Honduras, Nicaragua, and Panama
 Black softshell turtle, a species of freshwater turtle found in India (Assam) and Bangladesh (Chittagong).
 Black pond turtle, a species of turtle found in South Asia
 Black turtle bean, common variety of bean
 Black Turtle Cove, a mangrove estuary on the northern shores of Santa Cruz Island in Ecuador's Galapagos Islands
 Black turtle Goalie, Hockey goalie that's lying on his back 95 % of the time

See also 

 Black terrapin (disambiguation)
 Black mud turtle (disambiguation)
 

Animal common name disambiguation pages